InaD-like protein is a protein that in humans is encoded by the PATJ gene.

Function 

This gene encodes a protein with multiple PDZ domains. PDZ domains mediate protein-protein interactions, and proteins with multiple PDZ domains often organize multimeric complexes at the plasma membrane. This protein localizes to tight junctions and to the apical membrane of epithelial cells. A similar protein in Drosophila is a scaffolding protein which tethers several members of a multimeric signaling complex in photoreceptors.

Interactions 

INADL has been shown to interact with MPP5.

References

Further reading

External links